Orthromicta is a genus of moth in the family Cosmopterigidae.

Species
Orthromicta argonota Turner, 1923
Orthromicta galactitis Meyrick, 1897
Orthromicta semifumea Turner, 1923

References
Natural History Museum Lepidoptera genus database

Cosmopterigidae